The 2011–12 Liga Bet season saw Tzeirei Bir al-Maksur (champions of the North A division), Hapoel Migdal HaEmek (champions of the North B division), Hapoel Azor (champions of the South A division) and Maccabi Sha'arayim (champions of the South B division) win their regional divisions and qualify for promotion play-offs. Hapoel Migdal HaEmek and Maccabi Sha'arayim won the promotion play-offs and promoted to Liga Alef, while Tzeirei Bir al-Maksur and Hapoel Azor played for promotion against the 14th ranked club from Liga Alef, Hapoel Azor winning and gaining promotion as well and Tzeirei Bir al-Maksur losing and remaining in Liga Bet.

At the bottom, Maccabi Tirat HaCarmel, Hapoel Bnei Jadeidi (from North A division), Maccabi Or Akiva, Maccabi Barta'a (from North B division), Hapoel Pardesiya, Shimshon Bnei Tayibe (from South A division), Maccabi Sderot and Hapoel Mevaseret Zion (from South B division) were all automatically relegated to Liga Gimel

North A Division

Hapoel Bnei Jadeidi was dismissed from the league, demoted to Liga Gimel and its results were nullified.

North B Division

Maccabi Barta'a was dismissed from the league, demoted to Liga Gimel and its results were nullified.

South A Division

Shimshon Bnei Tayibe was dismissed from the league, demoted to Liga Gimel and its results were nullified.

South B Division

Promotion play-offs

North divisions

Final

Hapoel Migdal HaEmek promoted to Liga Alef; Tzeirei Bir al-Maksur advanced to promotion/relegation match against Hapoel Hadera from Liga Alef.

Promotion play-off match

Hapoel Hadera remained in Liga Alef; Tzeirei Bir al-Maksur remained in Liga Bet.

South divisions

Final

Maccabi Sha'arayim promoted to Liga Alef; Hapoel Azor advanced to promotion/relegation match against Maccabi Netivot from Liga Alef.

Promotion play-off match

Hapoel Azor promoted to Liga Alef; Maccabi Netivot relegated to Liga Bet.

References
 The Israel Football Association 
 The Israel Football Association 
 The Israel Football Association 
 The Israel Football Association 

4
Liga Bet seasons
Israel Liga Bet